Kurt Nielsen (19 November 1930 – 11 June 2011) was a Danish tennis player. He was born in Copenhagen, and was the first Danish tennis player ever to have played in a men's singles final in a Grand Slam tournament.

Nielsen reached the singles finals of Wimbledon in 1953 (beating Ken Rosewall and Jaroslav Drobný, then losing to Vic Seixas) and 1955 (beating Rosewall, then losing to Tony Trabert). Both times he reached the final, he was unseeded. Before this, he won the boys' singles at Wimbledon in 1947 (defeating Sven Davidson). Besides his successes at Wimbledon, he won the boys' singles at the French Open and reached the quarterfinals in the U.S. Championships in 1953.

With Althea Gibson, Nielsen won the U.S. Open mixed doubles in 1957, thereby becoming the first Dane to have won a Grand Slam event. During his long career, he won around 30 international titles, played 96 Davis Cup matches for Denmark (with a 53–43 record), and holds the record of having won the most Danish national tennis championships (50). Nielsen turned professional in 1960 and played on the pro circuit.

After ending his active career, Nielsen held numerous honourable positions in leading international tennis associations as well as served as the supervisor and referee at many Grand Slam events. He was a commentator on the Danish version of the TV channel Eurosport until late 2006.

Nielsen was the grandfather of Danish tennis player Frederik Løchte Nielsen. His grandson, at the 2012 Wimbledon men's doubles event, became the second Dane to win a Grand Slam tournament.

Grand Slam finals

Singles: (2 runner-ups)

Mixed doubles: (1 title, 1 runner-up)

Singles performance timeline

The following lists main draw appearances for Grand Slam and pre-Open Era Professional Major tournaments only.

Note: 1 First round bye

References

External links 
 
 
 
 Kurt Nielsen and Torben Ulrich (in dark sweater) play Tony Trabert and Vic Seixas at Kjøbenhavns Boldklub, Frederiksberg, Denmark in 1954. Link to video stream.

1930 births
2011 deaths
Danish male tennis players
French Championships junior (tennis) champions
Sportspeople from Copenhagen
United States National champions (tennis)
Wimbledon junior champions
Grand Slam (tennis) champions in mixed doubles
Professional tennis players before the Open Era
Grand Slam (tennis) champions in boys' singles